James Buchan (born 11 June 1954) is a Scottish novelist and historian.

Biography
Buchan is a son of the late William Buchan, 3rd Baron Tweedsmuir, and grandson of John Buchan, 1st Baron Tweedsmuir, the Scottish novelist and diplomat. He has several brothers and sisters, including the writer Perdita Buchan. Educated at Eton and Magdalen College, Oxford, he began his career as a Financial Times correspondent, writing from the Middle East, Germany, and the United States. In 1986, he married Lady Evelyn Rose Phipps, daughter of Oswald Phipps, 4th Marquess of Normanby. She died in 2018. He has three children.

Bibliography

Novels
A Parish of Rich Women (1984) Whitbread Book of the Year award, Betty Trask Award
Davy Chadwick (1987)
Slide (1991)
Heart's Journey in Winter (1995) (The Golden Plough in US) Guardian Fiction Prize
High Latitudes (1996)
A Good Place to Die (1999) (The Persian Bride in US)
The Gate of Air (2008)

Non-fiction
Frozen Desire: The Meaning of Money (1997)
Capital of the Mind: How Edinburgh Changed the World (2003) (Crowded with Genius: Edinburgh's Moment of the Mind'''' in US)Adam Smith and the Pursuit of Perfect  Liberty (2006) (The Authentic Adam Smith:His Life and Ideas in US)Days of God: The Revolution in Iran and its Consequences (2012) The Washington Institute for Near East Policy Book Prize (Silver Medal)John Law: A Scottish Adventurer of the Eighteenth Century'' (2018)

References

Scottish novelists
British reporters and correspondents
Fellows of the Royal Society of Literature
Costa Book Award winners
Living people
1954 births
Place of birth missing (living people)
People educated at Eton College
Alumni of Magdalen College, Oxford
Younger sons of barons